Ghulam "Guz" Khan (born ) is a British comedian, impressionist, and actor best known for his work in the TV show Man Like Mobeen and stand up appearances in Live at the Apollo.

Early life
Guz has two sisters who are ten and eleven years older than him. His father died when Khan was three. He is a Muslim of Pakistani Punjabi descent. Khan grew up on a housing estate in Hillfields, Coventry, and attended Stoke Park School.

He graduated from  Coventry University, and went on to teach Humanities at Grace Academy. In Sindhu Vee's 2020 BBC comedy podcast Things My Mother Never Told Me (... About Lockdown), Khan talks about being raised in a South Asian community and his relationship to his mother.

Career

Breakthrough 
Khan uploaded his first video to Facebook in 2014; in June of that year, he first performed on stage, opening for Aamer Rahman at Birmingham Repertory Theatre. His second time on stage was at a comedy evening at the Library of Birmingham BBC Asian Network organised for Comic Relief, with Citizen Khan. Khan performed under the stage name "Guzzy Bear".

In June 2015, whilst performing as his character Mobeen, a Muslim living in Small Heath, Khan made a video expressing mock outrage at the lead character in the film Jurassic World shouting the line "the Pachys are out of containment" (an abbreviation of pachycephalosaurus), observing it to be a homophone of Paki, a racial slur for people of Pakistani descent. In the video, Khan recounts a recent trip he and his friend took to the cinema to watch the film, describing some awkward incidents in the cinema whilst watching the film and raising the point that the phrase could sound exceptionally racist to the untrained ear. In six days, the video was watched over 340,000 times on YouTube, and it has also received over 700,000 views on Facebook. Khan's hashtag on Twitter, #BoycottJurassicWorld gained attention, and viewers also took to Twitter to voice their shock at the use of the derogatory term. After the Birmingham Mail publicised the story, Khan was interviewed by radio stations in the United States and Indonesia.

Stand-up comedy 
In December 2015, Khan performed at BBC Asian Network's Big Comedy Night in Birmingham, a special comedy night celebrating 50 years of Asian programmes on the BBC.

He has also performed on the BBC2 stand-up show Live at the Apollo, in an episode aired on 31 December 2017, hosted by the comedian Henning Wehn.

Television 
In June 2015, Khan made a short film Roadman Ramadan as part of the British Muslim Comedy series, five short films by Muslim comedians commissioned by the BBC to be released on BBC iPlayer. Khan's sketch was a guide to Ramadan, the Islamic month of fasting during daylight hours, which sees Khan's character Mobeen guide his newly converted friend Trev through his first Ramadan.

In July 2015, Khan gave up his job as a school teacher to pursue a career in comedy after his YouTube clips went viral. In November, he featured in an episode of comedy web series Corner Shop Show. In 2016, he went on to play the rambunctious baggage handler Mo Khan in Borderline.

In December 2017, Khan's four-part BBC comedy series Man Like Mobeen was released on BBC iPlayer. Two more series of the show were produced, which were released on BBC iPlayer in 2019 and 2020.

In March 2019, Khan appeared as a guest on Hypothetical.

In 2020, he appeared in Four Weddings And a Funeral, a miniseries created by Mindy Kaling that is a re-imagining of the original film.

In September 2021, Khan appeared on the twelfth series of Taskmaster.

In December 2021, Khan appeared as Bonzo in Beauty and the Beast: A Pantomime for Comic Relief, originally broadcast on BBC Two on Sunday 21 December.

In February 2022, Khan narrated the Peaky Blinders Ultimate Recap on BBC One.

In March 2022, Khan appeared in the HBO Max LGBTQ-friendly pirate series Our Flag Means Death, where he played Ivan, a member of Blackbeard's crew. Khan was the only main actor dropped ahead of the second season of the show. Responding to the decision, he tweeted: "This is the industry sometimes. They might be choosing a different direction creatively, maybe it's financial decision, maybe they weren't feeling your boy."

Commercial endorsements 
In June 2019, Khan appeared in an advert for Walkers crisps alongside the Spice Girls, playing Dev, the group's biggest fan.

In February 2020, Uber Eats launched a UK-wide brand campaign starring Khan as a charismatic courier spreading positivity.

Film 
In February 2017, Khan appeared as Rocky in the romantic comedy film Finding Fatimah.

In 2019, Khan appeared alongside Idris Elba in the Netflix comedy show Turn Up Charlie, which premiered on 15 March 2019.

In April 2022, Khan appeared in the main cast on the film The Bubble, playing actor Howie Frangopolous.

Filmography

Film

Television

Political views 
Khan supported Labour Party leader Jeremy Corbyn in the 2019 UK General Election, encouraging people to vote Labour. He is a supporter of the Palestinian cause.

Personal life
Khan is a Muslim. He lives with his wife and four children in the West Midlands, next door to his mother. Khan is a supporter of Manchester United F.C.

References

External links

 

1986 births
Living people
English Muslims
English people of Pakistani descent
English male comedians
English comedy writers
Muslim male comedians
British Internet celebrities
English video bloggers
English YouTubers
English male television actors
English male web series actors
English male actors of South Asian descent
21st-century English male actors
Schoolteachers from the West Midlands
People from Coventry
People educated at Stoke Park School and Community College
Male bloggers